Shaoxing North railway station is a railway station on the Hangzhou–Ningbo high-speed railway located in Yuecheng District, Shaoxing, Zhejiang, China. In the future, the station will be served by Line 1 of the Shaoxing Metro.

History
During construction, the station was sometimes called Shaoxing Keqiao railway station. The name Shaoxing North was confirmed in August 2012. The station was opened on 1 July 2013.

With the construction of the Hangzhou–Taizhou high-speed railway the station was expanded from the original four platforms to eight platforms. A new north-facing station building was also built. The line opened on 8 January 2022.

See also
Shaoxing East railway station
Shaoxing railway station

References

Railway stations in Zhejiang
Railway stations in China opened in 2013
Shaoxing Metro